Memory and Humanity is the fourth studio album by Welsh post-hardcore band Funeral for a Friend, released on 13 October 2008. The album was released through the band's own record label Join Us Records in the UK, Victory Records in the US and Canada, and Roadrunner Records in the rest of the world.

On 26 January 2008, drummer Ryan Richards made an announcement on the band's forum, stating that FFAF were to spend the first few months of the year recording, with a view to releasing a four or five track EP in March or April 2008. After writing more material than originally planned, the band decided to release a full-length album instead, expected out in September. Ryan also announced that the new album would contain harsh/screaming vocals, riffs and would be closer to Casually Dressed and Deep in Conversation than any of their other albums, although it would still be significantly different and more technical, saying that they want to move forward, and never back to any old style.

The first single from the album, "Waterfront Dance Club", was released on 14 July 2008, in the 7" format as a double A-side along with the track "Beneath the Burning Tree", whilst the song "Waterfront Dance Club" was released as a free download on the same day.

On 9 August 2008, the video for the second single from the album, "Kicking and Screaming", appeared on the band's MySpace page.

The album was released on 13 October 2008 and reached #17 in the UK album charts selling 10,000 copies.

Track listing

Personnel 
Funeral for a Friend:
Kris Coombs-Roberts – guitar
Gareth Ellis-Davies  – bass guitar, backing vocals
Matthew Davies-Kreye – vocals, guitar (tracks 11), keyboards (tracks 1, 3, 9 and 13)
Ryan Richards – drums, unclean vocals, keyboards (tracks 12), guitar (tracks 13)
Darran Smith – guitar
Romesh Dodangoda - producer, engineer, mixing, backing vocals (tracks 1 and 9)
Matthew Evans - backing vocals (track 1)
Lee Gaze, Mike Lewis, Stuart Richardson and Ilan Rubin of Lostprophets - backing vocals (track 9)
Rob Thomas - assistant engineer
Ted Jensen - mastering
Memory and Humanity was recorded at Long Wave Studios in Cardiff, Wales, and produced by Romesh Dodangoda

Charts

References

2008 albums
Funeral for a Friend albums
Victory Records albums
Roadrunner Records albums
Albums produced by Romesh Dodangoda